Tick, Tick, Tick, stylized as ...tick...tick...tick..., is a 1970 American crime drama film directed by Ralph Nelson. It was released by Metro-Goldwyn-Mayer. Racially provocative for its time, it stars Jim Brown in the role of an African American man elected as the sheriff of a rural county in the American South. It has become something of a cult classic for its cutting-edge portrayal of racial relations and its tense narrative.

Plot
In a small Southern town, Jim Price is elected sheriff over John Little, the incumbent. Racial tensions exist in the community, and Price gets little assistance from Little, who is leaving office, or from Mayor Parks, who insists he be consulted on any decision the new sheriff makes.

A white man, John Braddock, is arrested on a manslaughter charge after his drunken driving causes the death of a young girl. Braddock's father carries considerable influence and demands his son be freed. Price's deputy, Bradford Wilkes, is beaten by Little's former deputy, Bengy Springer.

Another arrest is made, this time of a black man, George Harley, accused of rape. The townspeople's mood turns uglier by the minute, particularly when Braddock's father threatens to spring his son by force if necessary.

Little's conscience gets the better of him. He agrees to become Price's new deputy. Together, they try in vain to persuade other men in town to side with them against Braddock's vigilantes and to convince the mayor to call in the National Guard for help. Alone against the mob, Price and Little form a barricade and prepare for the worst when their fellow townsmen suddenly join them in the street.

Cast

 Jim Brown as Jim Price
 George Kennedy as John Little
 Fredric March as Mayor Jeff Parks
 Lynn Carlin as Julia Little
 Don Stroud as Bengy Springer
 Janet MacLachlan as Mary Price 
 Richard Elkins as Bradford Wilkes
 Clifton James as D.J. Rankin
 Bob Random as John Braddock
 Mills Watson as Joe Warren
 Bernie Casey as George Harley
 Anthony James as H.C. Tolbert
 Dub Taylor as Junior
 Ernest Anderson as Homer
 Karl Swenson as Braddock Sr.

Production

Writing
Screenwriter and producer James Lee Barrett also created the television adaptation of In the Heat of the Night.

Casting
The film's lead was played by Jim Brown, who had recently retired as a professional football player. Brown and George Kennedy had previously appeared together in the war film The Dirty Dozen. Another co-star, Bernie Casey, had played in the National Football League from 1961–68, his career intersecting with that of Brown, who was an NFL star from 1957-65.

It was the penultimate film appearance of screen legend Fredric March.

Filming
It was made in and around Colusa, California. The town's central courthouse square was remodeled to appear like those found in the American South. The same courthouse was also used for exterior shots in the 1962 classic To Kill a Mockingbird.

Release
The film was released theatrically in the United States by Metro-Goldwyn-Mayer in January 1970, the same year as Nelson's Soldier Blue. It was shown in an anamorphic 2.40:1 aspect ratio.  A radio advertisement for the film summarized the story simply: "tick...tick...tick is the sound of time...running out."

Home media
The film was never given an official VHS release in the United States.  It was released on DVD in 2012 via the Warner Archive on-demand service.

See also
 List of American films of 1970

References

External links
 
 
 
 ...tick...tick...tick... at FilmInAmerica.com (formerly Northern California Movies)

1970 films
1970 crime drama films
American crime drama films
Blaxploitation films
Films about race and ethnicity
Films directed by Ralph Nelson
Films scored by Jerry Styner
Films set in Mississippi
Metro-Goldwyn-Mayer films
1970s English-language films
1970s American films